Australian Food and Grocery Council (AFGC) is an industry association of Australia's food, drink, and grocery manufacturing sector. AFGC's vision is set to make Australia's food, beverage and grocery manufacturing industry to be socially responsible and competing profitably in domestic market and as well as overseas. The chief executive officer of the Australian Food and Grocery Council is former Liberal party politician Kate Carnell, who was Chief Minister of the Australian Capital Territory (ACT) from 1995 to 2000.

It is a membership based organisation striving to work on behalf of the industry to influence policy, offer service to members of the council, and presenting a united voice for the industry.

Political influence
In November 2009, the AFGC successfully lobbied the coalition to exempt agriculture and food processing from their emissions trading scheme negotiations. Dr. Rosemary Stanton has argued this was a lost opportunity to reform the food industry and the health of Australians.

The AFGC has also supported advertisements for a business lobby group describing itself as "Responsible Recycling" that criticise the Northern Territory container deposit scheme as a variety of it.

References

External links
Australian Food and Grocery Council

Food industry trade groups
Business organisations based in Australia